The Bootleg Beatles are a Beatles tribute band. They have performed over 4,000 times since their establishment in March 1980.

History 
The Bootleg Beatles were formed by Andre Barreau, Neil Harrison and David Catlin-Birch, fellow London cast members of Beatlemania, following the final show of the West End musical. The band invested their dwindling finances in two guitars – an Epiphone and a Gretsch – as well as two Vox amplifiers, four black polo-necks and a wig.

Their first performance was at a small student gathering in Tiverton, Devon, England. Following more low-profile gigs, the band performed a 60-date tour of the Soviet Union; further tours followed in Israel (1982 and 1986), the Far East, and India. In February 1984, they were invited to perform in the United States, to commemorate The Beatles' initial US tour 20 years earlier.

UK success continued to prove elusive. In 1990, The Bootleg Beatles booked 10 shows in cities in which the Beatles had performed in their final UK tour in 1965. Audiences were small but enthusiastic, and another tour was booked for the following year. This proved more popular, and as each year went by the crowds grew, the tours expanded, and the venues got larger. Finally, a gig in Southampton caught the attention of Oasis, leading to the Bootleg Beatles supporting the Britpop band at Earls Court and Knebworth. This gave the band a contemporary audience and increased their credibility, launching them onto the premier European festival circuit and shared stages with Rod Stewart, Bon Jovi, David Bowie, The Corrs, Manic Street Preachers and Iggy Pop.

On 30 January 1999, the band played on the rooftop of 3 Savile Row, London, former residence of the Beatles' Apple Corps company, recreating the Beatles' final public live performance which took place on the same rooftop 30 years earlier. In 2009 the band hoped to mark the 40th anniversary by recreating the performance again, but unfortunately health and safety concerns prevented the appearance.

In 2002, the band played at Queen Elizabeth II's Golden Jubilee Party at Buckingham Palace.

2010 saw the band headline the Acoustic Stage at Glastonbury Festival, drawing the biggest crowd for 5 years. They also made a number of appearances on BBC television, including The One & Only, The One Show and I'm In a Rock'n'Roll Band, as well as on BBC Radio.

In March 2011, founder member Neil Harrison announced that he was leaving the group. On 18 July, a press release announced his replacement as Adam Hastings, a musician from Newcastle upon Tyne. It was announced in September 2012 that longtime member David Catlin-Birch was leaving the group.

It was announced that they would perform on the acoustic stage at the 2013 Glastonbury Festival.

Andre Barreau's last gig was at Hyde Park in London on 13 July 2014.

After Barreau's departure, there are currently no original members touring as the Bootleg Beatles.

In 2017, Professor Nigel Osborne (Edinburgh University) was commissioned by the Royal Liverpool Philharmonic Orchestra to arrange Sgt. Pepper's Lonely Hearts Club Band for concerts with the Bootleg Beatles performed to capacity crowds at the Royal Albert Hall and Echo Arena Liverpool.

Meeting the Beatles

Their first meeting was in 1996 at David Gilmour's 50th birthday party.  Gilmour booked both the Bootleg Beatles and the Australian Pink Floyd Show as he'd "always wanted to have the Beatles support Pink Floyd".  George Harrison was in the audience and quipped "you probably know the chords better than I do" and "Where's the Bootleg Brian Epstein? 'Cos he's got all the money!"

The second meeting was at the Party at the Palace for the Golden Jubilee of Elizabeth II in 2002, where McCartney headlined.

Show format 
Typically, each gig consists of performances of songs from four eras. For the 2022 Tour, these were:
 Part One: Cavern Club (1962-1963): "
 Part Two: Beatlemania and the touring years (1964–1966):
(Interval)
 Part Three: Magical Mystery Tour (1967):
 Part Four: The Get Back sessions and rooftop concert (1969):

Since 2017, the band have done special sets of albums celebrating a 50th anniversary that year and have begun 60th anniversary sets for Please Please Me. 

These sets usually contain a number of deep album tracks that are rarely performed by other tribute bands. 

 2017: Sgt Pepper’s / Magical Mystery Tour 
 2018: White Album 
 2019: Abbey Road 
 2020 (also 2021 & 2022 due to covid postponements): Let It Be 
 2022 / 2023: Please Please Me (60th anniversary celebration)

Band members

Current members
Tyson Kelly (John Lennon) – guitar, vocals, keyboard, harmonica (2018–present)
Steve White (Paul McCartney) – bass, vocals, keyboard (2012–present)
Stephen Hill (George Harrison) – guitar, vocals (2014–present)
Gordon Elsmore (Ringo Starr) – drums, percussion, vocals (2016–present)
Former members
Adam Hastings (John Lennon) – guitar, vocals, keyboards, harmonica (2011–2018)
Hugo Degenhardt (Ringo Starr) – drums, percussion, vocals (2003–2016)
Andre Barreau (George Harrison) – guitar, vocals (1980–2014)
David Catlin-Birch (Paul McCartney) – bass, vocals, keyboards (1980–1987, 2001–2012)
Neil Harrison (John Lennon) – guitar, vocals, keyboards (1980–2011)
Rick Rock (Ringo Starr) – drums, percussion, vocals (1981–2003)
Paul Cooper (Paul McCartney) – bass, vocals, keyboards (1987–2001)
David Barnett (Ringo Starr) - drums, percussion, vocals (1994, 2002–2003)
Jack Lee Elgood (Ringo Starr) – drums, percussion, vocals (1980–1981)

Orchestra and other musicians
Max Langley – keyboards, percussion
Matt Grocutt – trumpet, piccolo trumpet, percussion
Vanessa King – French horn, flute, vocals, percussion
Harriet Baker – flute, saxophone
Chris Cole – trombone
Tom Bott – violin, swarmandal
Sarah Chapman – viola
Sheila Holdsworth – viola
Robert Woollard – cello, fireman's bell

Timeline

References

External links
 The Bootleg Beatles

The Beatles tribute bands
Musical groups established in 1980
Musical groups from London